Sabile is a town in Talsi Municipality, Latvia.

Sabile was first mentioned in chronicles in 1253. From the 14th century to the 16th century, it was a site of a castle of the Livonian Order and a village near the castle. Sabile became a town in 1917. The Sabile Wine hill (Sabiles Vīna Kalns) used to be the most northern open-air vineyard in the world, registered in the Guinness Book of Records. The winemaking tradition in Sabile dates back to the 16th century. For the first time, wine production was created here during Livonia (14th century), and the hill was completely restored in 1936 during by the mayor Osvalds Rezebergs. The Sabile Castle Mound, which was the center of the district from the 10th century to the 13th century, overlooks Sabile and the valley of the Abava River.

See also
List of cities in Latvia

References

 
Latvian wine
Towns in Latvia
1917 establishments in Latvia
Populated places established in 1917
Talsi Municipality